RK Lovćen Cetinje is a permanent member of the Regional SEHA League since its establishing.

In their first SEHA League season, Lovćen made surprising result, with final placement on 6th position. Year after that, Lovćen finished season on the same table position.

In the season 2013/14, because of new SEHA League criteria, SRC Lovćen hall was reconstructed, with changing capacity from 1,500 to 2,020.

Records

Largest victory: 18:28,  Bosna Sarajevo –  Lovćen Cetinje, 5 March 2012, Sarajevo
Largest defeat: 36:19,  Lovćen Cetinje –  Vardar Skopje 23:41, 6 March 2014, Cetinje
Largest home victory: 31:22,  Lovćen Cetinje –  Sutjeska Nikšić, 10 March 2012, Cetinje
Largest defeat away: 35:19,  Vardar Skopje -  Lovćen Cetinje, 16 October 2013, Skopje
Longest unbeaten streak: 5 matches, (5 March 2012 − 15 September 2012), (13 November 2012 − 19 February 2013)
Longest losing streak: 7 matches, (3 December 2013 − 14 March 2014)
Most scored goals in a match: 34,  Lovćen Cetinje –  Co Zagreb 34:35, 8 November 2013, Cetinje
Most goals against in a match: 41,  Lovćen Cetinje –  Tatran Prešov 23:41, 6 March 2014, Cetinje
Player with most scored goals in a match: 14, Igor Marković,  Izviđač Ljubuški –  Lovćen Cetinje 31:27, 15 September 2012, Ljubuški
Highest home attendance: 1,800,  Lovćen Cetinje –  Partizan Belgrade 31:28, 29 November 2013, Cetinje
Highest away attendance: 2,000,  Metaloplastika Šabac –  Lovćen Cetinje 21:25, 20 March 2012, Šabac

Opponents

During their participation in the SEHA League, Lovćen played against 15 different opponents from Bosnia and Herzegovina, Belarus, Croatia, Macedonia, Montenegro, Serbia and Slovakia.

Below is the list of opponents and results of matches which Lovćen played against every single team in the SEHA League.

In every season, on the first column is the result of the home match

SEHA League 2011-12

Team and results

During the season 2011/12, in the Lovćen player roster for SEHA League were Abramović, Borilović, Drašković, Grbović, Jovetić, Kaluđerović, Lasica, Latković, Lipovina, I. Marković, N. Marković, Pejović, Perišić, F. Popović, M. Popović, Radović, Simić, Stanković. Coach: Pero Milošević (September - end of the season)

In the season 2011/12, Lovćen played 21 games. First season of the regional competition, Lovćen finished with 36 points - 12 wins and 9 losses. During the season, Lovćen made a few great results, like wins against Zagreb (27:25), Bosna Sarajevo (29:25, 28:18), Crvena zvezda Belgrade (26:20) etc.

Table

In the season 2011/12, Lovćen finished championship at the sixth place of table.

SEHA League 2012-13

Team and results

During the season 2012/13, in the Lovćen player roster for SEHA League were Abramović, Daskalovski, Drašković, Grbović, Jovetić, Lasica, Lipovina, Marković, Nikolić, Pejović, Perišić, Popović, I. Radović, M. Radović, G. Vujović, L. Vujović and S. Vujović. Coach: Pero Milošević (September - November 2012), Zoran Abramović (November 2012 - end of the season)

In the season 2012/13, Lovćen played 18 games. Second season of the regional competition, Lovćen finished with 9 wins, 2 draws and 7 losses, or 29 points. During the season, Lovćen made a few surprisingly results, like wins against Zagreb (30:28), Tatran Prešov (30:29), Vardar Skopje (23:21), a draw against Meshkov Brest (29:29) etc.

Table

In the season 2012/13, Lovćen again finished championship at the sixth place of table.

SEHA League 2013-14

Team and results

During the season 2013/14, in the Lovćen player roster for SEHA League were Abramović, Borilović, Cicmil (goalkeepers), Drašković, Lasica, Peruničić, Stanojević (left backs), Nikolić, Vukićević, Petričević (centre backs), Latković, Achruk, Kulenović, Ojdanić (right backs), Marković, Popović, Lipovina (left wings), Pejović, I. Radović, Čizmović (pivots), Kaluđerović and M. Radović (right wings). Coach: Kasim Kamenica (September - November 2013), Zoran Abramović (November 2013 - end of the season)

During the season, Lovćen played 18 matches in the regional competitions. With 3 wins, 2 draws and 13 defeats, that was the worst season of the club in SEHA liga. At the end, Lovćen was placed at 9th position of the table.

Table

In the season 2013/14, Lovćen finished championship at the 9th place of table.

See also
 RK Lovćen
 RK Lovćen in the First League
 SEHA League

Lovćen Cetinje
Lovcen
Lovcen
SEHA League